"Washington Bullets" is a song from The Clash's 1980 album Sandinista!. A politically charged song, it is a simplified version of imperialist history from the 1959 Cuban Revolution to the Nicaraguan Sandinistas of the 1980s, with mention of the Bay of Pigs Invasion, the Dalai Lama, Salvador Allende and Víctor Jara, referencing his death at the hands of the Chilean military dictatorship in the stadium that now bears his name. Although mainly a criticism of the foreign policy of the United States, the song's final stanza also delivers a criticism of Communist states by making reference to the treatment of pacifist Buddhist monks in the People's Republic of China during the Cultural Revolution and the Soviet Union's Invasion of Afghanistan.

The song's title is often thought to have been a pun on the name of Washington DC's basketball team, the Washington Bullets (now called the Washington Wizards), but frontman Joe Strummer denied any knowledge of the basketball team prior to the song's release.

The song is one of The Clash's more experimental, in the reggae style, with a marimba and lyrics that are almost spoken rather than sung. Though the marimba is the most prominent instrument, electric guitar riffs are still audible. The marimba part is an altered version of the melody from "Turkey in the Straw".

On the tribute album The Clash Tribute: The Never Ending Story, the song was covered by Attila the Stockbroker, with new lyrics to the later verses, omitting the reference to Afghanistan and The Clash's subtle attack on communism. The new verses are critical of U.S. involvement in the end of the Soviet Union, and Boris Yeltsin's embrace of western-style capitalism, making particular disparaging references to the new world order following the end of the Cold War.

See also
 List of anti-war songs

References

1980 songs
Anti-war songs
The Clash songs
Songs about Chile
Songs about Cuba
Songs about Nicaragua
Songs about China
Songs about Tibet
Songs about Afghanistan
Cultural depictions of the 14th Dalai Lama
Songs written by Mick Jones (The Clash)